Tamás Mórocz (born 2 July 1987) is a Hungarian indie musician, best known as the lead singer of the Hungarian indie band Jacked and Bermuda.

Early life and personal life
Mórocz was born in Székesfehérvár, Hungary.

Jacked
Mórocz is the founding member of Jacked.

Bermuda
Mórocz is the founding member of Bermuda.

In 2012, the hit single Monte Carlo was released.

In 2013, Bermuda's second single was released entitled, London.

In 2014, the A Délután az Új Éjszaka was released.

Discography
With Jacked:
Albums
 Stop The Show (2011)

With Bermuda:
Singles
 Monte Carlo (2012)
 London (2013)

See also
Budapest indie music scene
Carbovaris

References

External links
 Mórocz on Port.hu

1987 births
Living people
Hungarian indie rock musicians